Carroll Group may refer to:

 Carroll Group An international property group that collapsed in the 1990s.
 Thomas Carroll Group A Welsh financial services group.
 W Carroll Group A Liverpool waste management group.